The Shire of Blackall was a local government area located in central Queensland around the town of Blackall.

The council consisted of a Mayor and 9 elected councillors. No wards or electoral divisions existed.

The Barcoo River passes through the shire's former area and the dominant industry is sheep and cattle grazing.

History 

Kargoolnah Division was created on 11 November 1879 as one of 74 divisions around Queensland under the Divisional Boards Act 1879 with a population of 726. The division included the areas of Blackall, Tambo and Barcaldine and parts of Jericho (these areas are now part of the Barcaldine Region). Its headquarters were in Blackall.

On 20 May 1880, the urban part of Blackall was excised from the Kargoolnah Division to create a municipal Borough of Blackall and its first councillors were elected in July 1880.

With the passage of the Local Authorities Act 1902, Kargoolnah Division became the Shire of Kargoolnah on 31 March 1903, while the Borough of Blackall became the Town of Blackall. The town was abolished on 7 November 1931 and became Division 3 of the Shire of Kargoolnah, which had in the meantime shrunk to include only the Blackall region. On 19 November 1932, after representations to the State Government, the Shire of Kargoolnah was officially renamed Shire of Blackall.

On 15 March 2008, under the Local Government (Reform Implementation) Act 2007 passed by the Parliament of Queensland on 10 August 2007, the Shire of Blackall merged with the Shire of Tambo to form the Blackall-Tambo Region.

Towns and localities 
The Shire of Blackall included the following settlements:

 Blackall
 Yalleroi (ghost town)
 Northhampton Downs
 Terrick Terrick
 Malvern Hills
 Alice Downs

Population

Chairmen
 1891: A. Parnell 
 1927: S. Blackstock 
In 1993, the Local Government Act Number 70 was introduced; it included that all heads of local government councils should be known as mayors and all other elected representatives were to be known as councillors.

References

Further reading

External links
 University of Queensland: Queensland Places: Blackall and Blackall Shire

Former local government areas of Queensland
1879 establishments in Australia
2008 disestablishments in Australia
Populated places disestablished in 2008